Powder Valley School is a K-12 public school in North Powder, Oregon, United States.

Academics 
In 2008, 89% of the school's seniors received their high school diploma. Of 18 students, 16 graduated and 2 dropped out.

References 

High schools in Union County, Oregon
Education in Union County, Oregon
Public middle schools in Oregon
Public high schools in Oregon
Public elementary schools in Oregon